Aylesford Pit is a  geological Site of Special Scientific Interest north of Maidstone in Kent. It is a Geological Conservation Review site. 

This Pleistocene site has yielded many mammalian bones and paleolithic artefacts, but its geographical isolation from other sites in the Thames sequence makes its precise correlation uncertain.

The site is private land with no public access.

References

Sites of Special Scientific Interest in Kent
Geological Conservation Review sites